Guy Smith may refer to:

Sports
Guy Smith (ice hockey, born 1892) (1892–1951), Canadian professional ice hockey player
Guy Smith (baseball), American baseball player
Guy Smith (ice hockey, born 1950), Canadian former professional ice hockey player
Guy Smith (racing driver) (born 1974), English racing driver
Guy Smith (footballer) (born 1996), Dutch footballer

Others
Guy Smith (bishop) (1880–1957), Anglican bishop
Guy D. Smith (1907–1981), American soil scientist
Guy N. Smith (1939-2020), English writer
Guy Smith (writer) (born 1957), based in San Francisco
Guy Smith, producer of the British television series The Conspiracy Files

See also
Mister Sensitive (real name Guy Smith), a fictional character from Marvel Comics
Guy Smit, Dutch footballer